"It Hurts Too Much" is a 1980 song by Eric Carmen.  It was the lead single from his fourth album, Tonight You're Mine, and was the more successful of two releases from the LP.

The song reached number 75 on the U.S. Billboard Hot 100 and number 71 on Record World.  It was also a big regional hit in Perth, Australia. "It Hurts Too Much" did best in South Africa, where it reached number three and became Carmen's biggest hit in that nation.

Later uses
"It Hurts Too Much" was featured on the soundtrack of the 2010 comedy movie, Super.

Chart history

Cover versions
The Shivvers covered the song on their LP, Lost Hits From Milwaukee's First Family Of Powerpop 1979-82.

References

External links
 

1980 songs
1980 singles
Eric Carmen songs
Songs written by Eric Carmen
Song recordings produced by Harry Maslin
Arista Records singles